U-16 may refer to one of the following German submarines:

 , was the lead ship of the Type U 16 class of submarines; launched in 1911 and served in the First World War until sunk in an accident on 8 February 1919, en route to surrender
 During the First World War, Germany also had these submarines with similar names:
 , a Type UB I submarine launched in 1915 and sunk 10 May 1918
 , a Type UC II submarine launched in 1916 and lost in October 1917
 , a Type IIB submarine that served in the Second World War and was sunk on 25 October 1939
 , a Type 206 submarine of the Bundesmarine that was launched in 1973 and was sold to Columbia after decommissioning in 2011 for spare parts.

U-16 or U-XVI may also refer to:
 , a U-10 class submarine of the Austro-Hungarian Navy

Submarines of Germany